Mehrian (also Romanized as Mehrīān and Mehreyān; also known as Mehrabān and Mehrīān-e ‘Olyā) is a village in Sarrud-e Shomali Rural District, in the Central District of Boyer-Ahmad County, Kohgiluyeh and Boyer-Ahmad Province, Iran. At the 2006 census, its population was 4,857, in 1,000 families.

References 

Populated places in Boyer-Ahmad County